James Frederick Jones (18 December 1931 – 1 July 1998) was a New Zealand cricketer who played first-class cricket for Wellington and Central Districts from 1950 to 1957. 

A right-arm fast-medium bowler, Jim Jones twice took his best first-class figures of 4 for 39. In 1950–51, in his second match, he took 2 for 24 and 4 for 39 in Wellington's victory over Auckland. In 1953–54, in his first match for Central Districts, he took 4 for 55 and 4 for 39 in a drawn match against Wellington.

References

External links

 Jim Jones at CricketArchive

1931 births
1998 deaths
New Zealand cricketers
Wellington cricketers
Central Districts cricketers
Cricketers from Wellington City